Oregon Route 410 (OR 410) is an Oregon state highway running from Sumpter to OR 7 near Sumpter. OR 410 is known as the Sumpter Highway.

OR 410 was established in 2003 as part of Oregon's project to assign route numbers to highways that previously were not assigned, and, as of June 2020, was unsigned.

Route description 

OR 410 begins at the western city limits of Sumpter and heads east through Sumpter.

History 
The Sumpter Highway originally ran to the current intersection of OR 7 and OR 245 in Salisbury and was designated as OR 220.  This designation was removed in the 1980s when the section east of the current terminus was redesignated as part of the Whitney Highway and OR 7.  OR 410 was assigned to the Sumpter Highway in 2003.

Major intersections

References 
 Oregon Department of Transportation, Descriptions of US and Oregon Routes, https://web.archive.org/web/20051102084300/http://www.oregon.gov/ODOT/HWY/TRAFFIC/TEOS_Publications/PDF/Descriptions_of_US_and_Oregon_Routes.pdf, page 30.
 Oregon Department of Transportation, Sumpter Highway No. 410, ftp://ftp.odot.state.or.us/tdb/trandata/maps/slchart_pdfs_1980_to_2002/Hwy410_2001.pdf
 Oregon Highways, Oregon Secondary State Routes (archive), https://web.archive.org/web/20050313200053/http://www.ylekot.com/orehwys/Routes_Secondary.html#ORE-220

410
Transportation in Baker County, Oregon